John Arthur Sharp (27 May 1931 – 22 July 1981) was a Canadian rower. He competed in the men's eight event at the 1952 Summer Olympics.

References

1931 births
1981 deaths
Canadian male rowers
Olympic rowers of Canada
Rowers at the 1952 Summer Olympics
Rowers from Toronto